Agesipolis II (died 369 BC), son of the king Cleombrotus I, succeeded his father and reigned as Agiad King of Sparta.  His rule was exceedingly brief, from, at most, 371 until his death in 369 BC. He was succeeded by his brother Cleomenes II.

References

369 BC deaths
4th-century BC rulers
4th-century BC Spartans
Agiad kings of Sparta
Year of birth unknown